Vitaly Ushakov (18 July 1920 – 1987) was a Soviet water polo player. He competed in the men's tournament at the 1952 Summer Olympics.

References

External links
 

1920 births
1987 deaths
Soviet male water polo players
Olympic water polo players of the Soviet Union
Water polo players at the 1952 Summer Olympics
Sportspeople from Moscow